Acanthocardia is a genus of  saltwater clams, marine bivalve molluscs in the family Cardiidae. Like most other bivalves, these mollusks are suspension feeders. This genus is present from the Upper Oligocene to the Recent.

Species
 Acanthocardia aculeata  Linnaeus, 1758
 Acanthocardia deshayesii  Payraudeau, 1826
 Acanthocardia echinata  Linnaeus, 1758
 Acanthocardia mucronata  Poli, 1795
 Acanthocardia paucicostata  Sowerby, 1834
 Acanthocardia spinosa  Lightfoot, 1786
 Acanthocardia tuberculata  (Linnaeus, 1758)

Gallery

References
 Biolib
 World Register of Marine Species.
 Paleobiology Database
 Sepkoski Online
 

Cardiidae
Bivalve genera
Extant Chattian first appearances